Leeds North was a borough constituency in the city of Leeds, West Yorkshire, which returned one Member of Parliament (MP)  to the House of Commons of the Parliament of the United Kingdom, elected by the first past the post voting system.

Boundaries
1885–1918: The Municipal Borough of Leeds wards of Headingley and North West, and parts of the wards of Brunswick, North, and North East.

1918–1950: Parts of the County Borough of Leeds wards of Brunswick, Headingley, North, and North West.

1950–1955: The County Borough of Leeds wards of North, Roundhay, and Woodhouse.

History
The constituency was created in 1885 by the Redistribution of Seats Act 1885, and was first used in the general election of that year.  Leeds had previously been represented by two MPs (1832–1868) and three MPs (1868–1885). From 1885 it was represented by five single-member constituencies: Leeds Central, Leeds East, Leeds North, Leeds South and Leeds West.  The constituencies of Morley, Otley and Pudsey were also created in 1885.

The constituency was abolished in 1955. After the 1955 general election Leeds was represented by Leeds East (created 1885, abolished 1918, recreated 1955),   Leeds North East (created 1918), Leeds North West (created 1950), Leeds South, and Leeds South East (created 1918). There were also constituencies of Batley and Morley (created 1918) and Pudsey (created 1885, replaced by Pudsey and Otley 1918–1950).

Members of Parliament

Elections

Elections in the 1880s

Elections in the 1890s 

 Caused by Jackson's appointment as Chief Secretary to the Lord Lieutenant of Ireland

Elections in the 1900s

Elections in the 1910s 

General Election 1914–15

Another General Election was required to take place before the end of 1915. The political parties had been making preparations for an election to take place and by the July 1914, the following candidates had been selected; 
Liberal: Rowland Barran
Unionist: John Birchall

Elections in the 1920s

Elections in the 1930s 

General Election 1939–40:

Another General Election was required to take place before the end of 1940. The political parties had been making preparations for an election to take place and by the Autumn of 1939, the following candidates had been selected; 
Conservative: Osbert Peake
Labour: Ronald Hodgson
Liberal: Howard B Tanner

Elections in the 1940s

Elections in the 1950s

References 

Parliamentary constituencies in Yorkshire and the Humber (historic)
Constituencies of the Parliament of the United Kingdom established in 1885
Constituencies of the Parliament of the United Kingdom disestablished in 1955
Politics of Leeds